Lawrence "Bub" Bitcon (October 20, 1934 – May 3, 1973) was an American football coach.  He was the 14th head football coach at Illinois State University in Normal, Illinois, serving for seven seasons, from 1965 to 1971 and compiling a record of 32–35–2.

Bitcon was killed in a head-on automobile crash near Monmouth, Illinois on May 3, 1973.

Head coaching record

College

References

External links
 

1934 births
1973 deaths
American football halfbacks
Arkansas Razorbacks football coaches
Illinois State Redbirds football coaches
Northern Iowa Panthers football coaches
Northern Iowa Panthers football players
High school football coaches in Iowa
Road incident deaths in Illinois